Mir Kosh is a village in Ubauro, District Ghotki. The town is notorious for the bandits, kidnappers who kidnap people by phone friendship  in women voice and then invite them to their location and take ransom or leave them for death. Muhammad Ramzan the Additional Home Secretary of Khyber Pakhtunkhuwa was in touch with an anonymous female caller, who after making friendship with him, invited him to Ubauro city, Police raided there and then this issue was highlighted.

.  A youngster name Azhar a.k.a Lalo/ Laly son of Allah wadhaio Kosh invented this type of kidnapping which expanded in all over Sindh, Balochistan, and Punjab.

References

Villages in Ghotki District